The 6th CARIFTA Games was held in Bridgetown, Barbados on April 25–26, 1977.    For the first time, the Austin Sealy Award was presented to the athlete adjudged the most outstanding, either in terms of record accomplishment, or quality of performance as compared to other top medallists.

Participation (unofficial)

Detailed result lists can be found on the "World Junior Athletics History" website.  An unofficial count yields the number of about 114 athletes (84 junior (under-20) and 30 youth (under-17)) from about 13 countries:  Antigua and Barbuda (1), Bahamas (19), Barbados (19), Bermuda (11), Guadeloupe (4), Guyana (3), Jamaica (34), Lesser Antilles (1), Martinique (6), Saint Christopher-Nevis-Anguilla (2), Saint Vincent and the Grenadines (1), Trinidad and Tobago (12), US Virgin Islands (1).

Austin Sealy Award

For the first time, the Austin Sealy Trophy was awarded.  The recipient was Debbie Jones from Bermuda.  This year, she won 2 gold (100 m and 200 m), 1 silver (400 m), and 1 bronze medal (4 × 100 m relay).  Until then, she was the most successful athlete in the championships winning a total of 12 gold, 7 silver, and 2 bronze medals between 1973 and 1977.

Medal summary
Medal winners are published by category: Boys under 20 (Junior), Girls under 20 (Junior), Boys under 17 (Youth), Girls under 17 (Youth).
Complete results can be found on the "World Junior Athletics History" website.

Boys under 20 (Junior)

Girls under 20 (Junior)

Boys under 17 (Youth)

Girls under 17 (Youth)

Medal table (unofficial)

References

External links
World Junior Athletics History

CARIFTA Games
1977 in Barbados
CARIFTA
1977 in Caribbean sport
International athletics competitions hosted by Barbados